The Småvatna Hydroelectric Power Station is a hydroelectric power station in the municipality of Kvænangen in Troms county, Norway. The plant utilizes a  drop between Lake Lassa and Little Lakes. The Småvatna plant also utilizes water from Abo River and the Lassajavre Hydroelectric Power Station. The plant came into operation in 1969. The plant is controlled by Kvænangen Kraftverk AS, with a 48.2% share owned by Troms Kraft.

See also

 Kvænangsbotn Hydroelectric Power Station
 Lassajavre Hydroelectric Power Station

References

Hydroelectric power stations in Norway
Troms
Energy infrastructure completed in 1969
Dams in Norway